Maksym Arkadiyovych Buzhanskyi (born 24 November 1974, Dnipropetrovsk, Ukrainian SSR) is a Ukrainian  politician and blogger. He was elected to the Verkhovna Rada in 2019.

Early life 

Buzhanskyi was born on November 24, 1974, in Dnipropetrovsk in a Jewish family of engineers. His grandfather is Moisei Yurievich Buzhanskyi (born 1924 in Kharkiv) — a participant in the German-Soviet war, awarded the Order of the Patriotic War II degree. In 1992—1997 he studied at the Dnipro National University of Rail Transport, majoring in bridges and transport tunnels (urban engineer).

In 2017—2020, he was a co-author and television presenter of political programs on the ZIK TV channel, from 2020 to 2022 on the Ukraine 24 TV channel.

Candidate for People's Deputies from the Servant of the People party in the 2019 parliamentary elections (constituency 25, Checheliv district, part of the Amur-Lower Dnieper district of Dnipro). At the time of the election: the manager of Arna LLC lives in Dnipro.

Member of the Verkhovna Rada Committee on Law Enforcement.

During the preparations for the local elections of 2020, Buzhanskyi was appointed chairman of the Dnipro city organization of the political party Servant of the People.

Legislative activities 

Buzhanskyi is the author of the law on preventing and combating Antisemitism in Ukraine. According to the document, manifestations of antisemitism include, among other things, calls for the murder of Jews and its justification, Holocaust denial, deliberate destruction of buildings and places of worship for Jews. The document stipulates that a person who suffers from manifestations of antisemitism will be entitled to compensation for moral and material damage, and the perpetrators will be subject to civil and criminal liability. On September 22, 2021, the Verkhovna Rada passed the law in its second reading. The bill was supported by all factions and deputy groups of the Rada, except for the parties European Solidarity and Holos. On October 7, 2021, the law was signed by Ukrainian President Volodymyr Zelenskyy.

He is also the author of the law on voluntary military registration for women. On October 7, 2022, the law was adopted by the Verkhovna Rada. The bill appeared after the order of the Ministry of Defense of Ukraine came into force, expanding the list of professions for women who must be registered with the military. The document applied to women working in the field of librarianship, musical art, science, banking and other areas. A petition appeared on the website of the Office of the President of Ukraine for the abolition of the order, which gained 25,000 votes in just 4 days.

Awards 

He was awarded the medal "For Merits to the City" by the Dnieper City Council.

Books 

 Buzhanskyi M. A. History of the world in 88 chapters. Publishing house: Folio, 2017. ISBN 978-966-03-7943-5.
 Buzhanskyi M. A. History for the lazy. Publishing house: Folio, 2018. ISBN 978-966-03-8180-3.

References 

1974 births
Living people
Politicians from Dnipro
Servant of the People (political party) politicians
Ninth convocation members of the Verkhovna Rada